Thomas Kelly (died 1835) was an Irish prelate of the Roman Catholic Church. He served as Bishop of Dromore from 1826 to 1828 and Archbishop of Armagh from 1828 to 1835.

Biography
Kelly entered Maynooth in 1814 to study for the priesthood, was ordained for the diocese of Armagh in 1820, served as Dean and Professor of Dogmatic Theology in Maynooth. Kelly was elected Bishop of Dromore by the Propaganda Fide on 29 May 1826 and confirmed by Pope Leo XII on 4 June 1826. His episcopal ordination took place on 27 August 1826. 

Two years later, he was made coadjutor archbishop of Armagh, with right of succession, on 1 December 1828. 

He retained administration of the Diocese of Dromore until Michael Blake was appointed Bishop of Dromore in 1833. On the death of Archbishop Patrick Curtis of Armagh on 26 July 1832, Kelly automatically succeeded as archbishop.

He died in office on 13 January 1835.

References

Bibliography

 
 

1835 deaths
19th-century Roman Catholic archbishops in Ireland
Roman Catholic bishops of Dromore
Roman Catholic archbishops of Armagh
Alumni of St Patrick's College, Maynooth
1781 births